This a list of career achievements by Andy Murray.

At the 2012 US Open, Murray became the first British player since 1977, and the first British man since 1936, to win a Grand Slam singles tournament, when he defeated Novak Djokovic in the final in five sets. This title made him the only British male to become a Grand Slam singles champion during the Open Era. On 7 July 2013, Murray won the 2013 Wimbledon Championships, becoming the first British player to win a Wimbledon senior singles title since Virginia Wade in 1977, and the first British man to win the Men's Singles Championship since Fred Perry, 77 years previously. Murray is the only man in history to have won Olympic Gold and the US Open in the same calendar year, as well as the third man to hold the gold medal and two majors on different surfaces (after Andre Agassi and Rafael Nadal). He is also the first tennis player and only man in history to have won two Olympic gold medals in the singles category and on two different surfaces (grass in 2012, and hard 2016). Subsequent to his success at the Olympics in 2012 and Wimbledon in 2013, Murray was voted the 2013 BBC Sports Personality of the Year.

By reaching 2016 French Open final, Murray became the 10th man since the Open Era began in 1968 to reach the final of all four Grand Slam tournaments.

In 2016, he became the only man in history to win singles titles at a Grand Slam, the Olympic Games, a Masters 1000 event, and the Year-End Championships in the same calendar year.

Olympic Games
Murray is a two-time Olympic champion. In the 2012 Olympic Games, Murray defeated Roger Federer in straight sets to win the gold medal in the men's singles final, becoming the first British singles champion in over 100 years. In the 2016 Olympic Games, Murray defeated Juan Martín del Potro in 4 sets to defend his singles gold medal. He also won a silver medal in the mixed doubles, playing with Laura Robson.

Grand Slam tournaments – Open Era records
 These records were attained in the Open Era.
 Records in bold indicate peer-less achievements.
 Records in italics are currently active streaks.

Records at each Grand Slam tournament 
 These records were attained in the Open Era.
 Records in bold indicate peer-less achievements.
 Records in italics are currently active streaks.

Other selected records (Olympics, ATP 500 Series, ATP Masters 1000, & Davis Cup)

Personal achievements 

Achievements below are all as a singles player

See also
List of career achievements by Roger Federer
List of career achievements by Rafael Nadal
List of career achievements by Novak Djokovic

Awards and honours 

 BBC Young Sports Personality of the Year: 2004
 Most titles in an ATP World Tour season (6 titles): 2009
 US Open Series Champion: 2010, 2015
 Best ATP World Tour Match of the Year (3): 2010, 2011, 2012
 Officer of the Order of the British Empire: 2013
 Laureus "World Breakthrough of the Year" Award: 2013
 Glenfiddich Spirit of Scotland Award for Top Scot: 2013

 Glenfiddich Spirit of Scotland Award for Sport: 2013
 BBC Sports Personality of the Year: 2013, 2015, 2016
 Doctor of the University of Stirling: 2014
 Freeman of Stirling: 2014
 Freeman of Merton: 2014
 Arthur Ashe Humanitarian of the Year: 2014

Notes

References

Achievements
Murray, Andy